McBaine may refer to:

McBaine, Missouri, village in Missouri, United States
Neylan McBaine, American blogger

See also
McBain (disambiguation)